"Never" is the third single from Kristine W's album The Power of Music. The single became Kristine W's twelfth number one on the Billboard Hot Dance Club Play chart.

Track listing
 U.S. Maxi CD 
 "Never" (Love to Infinity Radio Mix) (4:20)
 "Never" (DJ Escape & Johnny Vicious Radio Mix) (4:15)
 "Never" (7th Heaven Radio Mix) (4:18)
 "Never" (DJ Peter Canellis & Kamil Bartoszcze Radio Mix) (3:57)
 "Never" (Nick Harvey Radio Mix) (4:29)
 "Never" (Brothers Behind the Light/M2 Radio Mix) (4:50)
 "Never" (Perry Twins Radio Mix) (4:36)
 "Never" (Ruff & Torte Club Mix) (7:48)
 "Never" (Love To Infinity Club Mix) (6:58)
 "Never" (DJ Escape & Johnny Vicious Club Mix) (8:04)
 "Never" (7th Heaven Club Mix) (7:49)
 "Never" (DJ Peter Canellis & Kamil Bartoszcze Backroom Mix) (8:12)
 "Never" (Perry Twins Electro-Club Mix) (7:46)

Chart positions

See also
List of number-one dance singles of 2009 (U.S.)

References

2008 singles
Kristine W songs
Songs written by Kristine W
2008 songs